Thitiwat Ritprasert (born 26 March 1997), also known as Ohm is a Thai actor model. He is best known for his roles in Until We Meet Again (TV series).

Early life and education 
Thitiwat Ritprasert was born on 26 March 1997. He graduated from Rajamangala University of Technology Thanyaburi with a bachelor's degree in the Faculty of Mass Communication Technology.

Career 
Thitiwat entered the entertainment industry by participating in the ‘Ch8 Asia New Star Model Contest Face of Thailand 2016’ and won the contest. He also got a special award from ‘Asia Model Festival 2016’. In 2017, he debuted in the first TV drama Jai Luang on Thai Channel 8. In 2019, his popularity grows rapidly after performed as Dean in Until We Meet Again (TV series) with Natouch Siripongthon.

Filmography

Television

Discography

Awards and nominations

References

External links
 

1997 births
Living people
Thitiwat Ritprasert
Thitiwat Ritprasert